S. erectum may refer to:
 Satyrium erectum, an orchid species endemic to southwestern and western Cape Province
 Sparganium erectum, a perennial plant species

See also
 Erectum (disambiguation)